Baldo can be either a given name, a nickname or a surname. It may refer to:

Given name:
 Baldo of Gallura, the Giudice (ruler) of Gallura, on Sardinia (-)
 Baldus de Ubaldis (1327–1400), Baldo degli Ubaldi in Italian, Italian jurist
 Baldo Angelo Abati, 16th-century Italian physician and naturalist
 Baldo Baldi (1888–1961), Italian fencer and Olympic champion (team)
 Baldassare Baldo di Gregorio (born 1984), German footballer
 Baldo Marro, Filipino actor, screenwriter, stunt director, film director and producer
 Baldo Prokurica (born 1958), Chilean lawyer, academic and politician
 Baldo Santana (born 1995), Spanish footballer known simply as Baldo

Surname:
 Giuseppe Baldo (1914–2007), Italian footballer
 Maria Baldó i Massanet (1884-1964), Spanish teacher, feminist, folklorist, and liberal politician
 Marta Baldó (born 1979), Spanish rhythmic gymnast and Olympic and world champion